ǀXam (pronounced , in English ) is considered an extinct language of South Africa formerly spoken by the ǀXam-ka ǃʼē of South Africa. It is part of the ǃUi branch of the Tuu languages and closely related to the moribund Nǁng language. Much of the scholarly work on ǀXam was performed by Wilhelm Bleek, a German linguist of the 19th century, who studied a variety of ǀXam spoken at Achterveld, and (with Lucy Lloyd) another spoken at Strandberg and Katkop while working with  ǁKábbo, Diaǃkwāin, ǀAǃkúṅta, ǃKwéite̥n ta ǁKēn, ǀHaṅǂkassʼō and other speakers. The surviving corpus of ǀXam comes from the stories told by and vocabulary recorded from these individuals in the Bleek and Lloyd Collection.

Name 
The pipe at the beginning of the name "ǀXam" represents a dental click, like the English interjection tsk, tsk! used to express pity or shame. The  denotes a voiceless velar fricative click accompaniment.

Compared to other Khoisan languages, there is little variation in rendering the name, though it is sometimes seen with the simple orthographic variant ǀKham, as well as a different grammatical form, ǀKhuai.

Phonology

Consonants 
Compared to other Tuu languages like Taa, ǀXam has a more restricted inventory of consonants particularly the clicks, where there are only 8 series of click accompaniments, far fewer than East ǃXoon Taa's 18. A preliminary consonant inventory of ǀXam, including egressive stops, fricatives, and affricates as well as ingressive clicks, is listed below.

Vowels 

Speech of mythological characters 

Bleek notes that particular animal figures in ǀXam mythology have distinctive speech patterns. For example, Tortoise substitutes clicks with labial non-clicks, Mongoose replaces clicks with ts, tsy, ty, dy etc., and Jackal makes use of a "strange" labial click, "which bears to the ordinary labial click ʘ, a relation in sound similar to that which the palatal click ǂ bears to the cerebral click ǃ". The Moon, and perhaps Hare and Anteater, even use "a most unpronounceable" click in place of all clicks save the bilabial. Other changes noted include the Blue Crane's speech, who ends the first syllable of almost every word with a /t/.

"Fragment about the animal clicks and ways of speaking Bushman" 
 The jackal has a flat lip click. 
 A kind of side click in the middle of the mouth. (referring to the jackal?)
 The moon has the joint of the tongue being turned up and back to the roof of the mouth. This click has a kind of palatal click with it.
 The lion talks with a (?) side click and a (?) guttural with it. 
 The hyena has a flat click.

Motto of South Africa 

ǀXam was used for the South African motto on the coat of arms adopted on 27 April 2000:
 
The intended meaning is Diverse people unite or, on a collective scale, Unity in Diversity. The word-for-word translation is people who are different meet. However, it is not known if that phrase would have been idiomatic in ǀXam. Because it is extinct, ǀXam is not one of the eleven official languages of South Africa.  Its last speakers died in the 1910s.

References

External links
Bleek and Lloyd Archive of ǀxam and ǃkun texts online
A crowdsourcing project to transcribe the Bleek and Lloyd Collection
South African coat of arms

Tuu languages
Languages of South Africa
Extinct languages of Africa
Karoo
Languages extinct in the 20th century